Galdor can refer to:

 Galdr, a magical song in some Germanic languages.
 Galdor, the father of Húrin in The Silmarillion.